Reinhold Münzenberg (25 January 1909 in Walheim – 25 June 1986 in Aachen) was a German football player, in the defender position.

Biography
Münzenberg spent most of his career with Alemannia Aachen (1927–1951) but also had spells with SV Werder Bremen and LSV Hamburg as a Wartime Guest Player. On the national level he played for Germany (41 matches, no goals), and was a participant at the 1934 and 1938 FIFA World Cups. Münzenberg was a member of the Breslau Eleven that beat Denmark 8–0 in Breslau in 1937 and went on to win 10 out 11 games played during that year. He was also part of Germany's squad at the 1936 Summer Olympics.

Münzenberg was considered to be one of the best and most athletic German defensive players of the 1930s. He started his career as a center half, a role in which the physically strong Münzenberg excelled, being one of the best headers of the ball of his time. After Germany had played at Wembley against England in 1935, the English press praised 'Steely' Münzenberg for his combination of toughness and technical ability, claiming that he played more 'English' than the English themselves. His reputation was one of athleticism and tremendous commitment. The first time Münzenberg made international football headlines, was after the 1934 World Cup third place game, when he marked the Czech goalgetter Josef Bican. By 1936, Münzenberg had been converted from center half to left back, another role in which excelled. The full back pairing of Paul Janes and Münzenberg became one of the best of the late-1930s in Europe. After he retired from football, Münzenberg became an architect. He died in 1986 only hours after having watched the World Cup semi final in which West Germany beat France 2–0.

In his 1978 book "Fußball", Helmut Schön characterised Münzenberg as follows:

"The counterpart to Paul Janes. He was edgier and harder, certainly not a finesse player; a man who as a defender would not beat around the bush."

References

External links
 
 Reinhold Münzenberg at worldfootball.net 

1909 births
1986 deaths
German footballers
Alemannia Aachen players
Germany international footballers
1934 FIFA World Cup players
1938 FIFA World Cup players
Olympic footballers of Germany
Footballers at the 1936 Summer Olympics
Association football defenders
German football managers
Alemannia Aachen managers
Luftwaffen-SV Hamburg players
Sportspeople from Aachen
Footballers from North Rhine-Westphalia